1. Name:

i) Present Name: Sahadevesvara Siva Temple

ii) Past Name: —

2. Location: Lat- 20 14' 22" N., Long- 850 49' 27" E., Elev 124 ft

i) Address & Approach: The temple is situated within the Bhimesvara temple
precinct. The temple is facing towards the north. The enshrined deity is a Siva-lingam over a
circular yonipitha. The inner sanctum measures 1.20 metres square on plan. .

ii) Tradition & legends: According to local people the Pandavas came to this place.

3. Ownership

i) Single/ Multiple: Multiple

ii) Public/ Private: Public

iii) Any other (specify): It is maintained by Bhimesvara Temple Trust Board.

iv) Name: Purusottam Sahu (president)

v) Address:
4. Age
i)Precise date:

ii) Approximate date: 20th Century A.D.

iii) Source of Information: Because of its architectural features and use of cement
mortar.

5. Property Type

i) Precinct/ Building/ Structure/Landscape/Site/Tank: Precinct

ii) Subtype: Temple

iii) Typology: Pidha deul.

6. Property use

i) Abandoned/ in use: In use

ii) Present use: Living temple

iii) Past use: Worshipped

7. Significance

i) Historic significance:

ii) Cultural significance: Sivaratri, Rudrabhiseka, Pana Sankranti.

iii) Social significance: Marriage, thread ceremony, mundankriya etc.

iv) Associational significance: —

8. Physical description

i) Surrounding : It is surrounded by Arjunesvara temple in east at a distance
of 0.55 metres and Bhimesvara temple in south at a distance of 4.00 metres.

ii) Orientation: Facing towards north.

iii) Architectural features (Plan and Elevation): On plan, the temple has a square vimana
measuring 1.85 metres, with a frontal porch. On elevation, the vimana is in pidha order and
measures 2.82 metres in height. The bada is plain and measures 1.12 metres in height, Gandi
measures 1.10 metres with five receding tiers and mastaka measures 0.60 metres in height. The
temple has a cement plaster with white wash.

iv) Raha niche & parsva devatas: —

v) Decorative features: —
Doorjambs: The doorjambs are plain and measure 1.30 metres x
0.46 metres.
Lintel: The lintel is plain.

Hindu temples in Bhubaneswar